Yuri Anufrievich Ivanov (Russian: Ю́рий Ану́фриевич Ивано́в; 1956–1989), known as The Ust-Kamenogorsk Maniac, was a Soviet rapist and serial killer. In the span of 13 years, he raped and killed 16 girls and women. He committed his crimes in Ust-Kamenogorsk, in the area of the "Combine of silk fabrics" factory.

Biography 
Yuri Ivanov worked as driver. He was married, as was his daughter. One day, he returned home from work and found his wife in bed with a lover. Ivanov then developed a hatred towards, and vowed to kill, women who cheat on their husbands. During the investigation, Ivanov said that he talked with a lot of women, learning about their opinions towards men. If the woman spoke ill of her husband or men as a whole, he would kill her. He would rape and subsequently choke his victims to death. After the murder, as a rule, he would take some of deceased's personal belongings.

He was eventually sentenced to three years imprisonment for attempted rape. In the colony, Ivanov worked as a driver. With the opportunity to travel beyond the colony, he committed several crimes while still serving time.

From 1977 to 1987, Ivanov did not kill, as his personal life was adjusted. But after he and his wife divorced in 1986, he returned to violent crime. In 1987, he killed a 16-year-old girl. At the crime scene, an aluminum button and a hair sample were found that did not belong to the victim. An ambush was set up at the murder scene the next day and, when Yuri Ivanov came back, he was arrested. Facing strong evidence against him (two of his cohabitants, whom he had given items from the victims, gave the police a purse with his fingerprint, and his jacket that lacked an aluminum button), Ivanov confessed to the rape and murders of sixteen women and girls and fourteen separate rapes. Ivanov remembered the events that spanned many years, short of slight details, directing police to all the crime scenes without much error. He said that he remembered the faces of his victims, and to prove this, the investigators devised a unique experiment - "identification of the contrary": they showed him photos of different women, so he would determine which of them he had raped or killed. Ivanov identified the pictures of his victims without mistake. For the murder of one of the women in 1974, the victim's husband was convicted. By that time he had served most of the term - 7 out of 12 years. The verdict against him was later abolished, and the murder correctly imputed to Ivanov.

Yuri Ivanov himself asked for the death penalty, and in 1989, he was sentenced to death. Before the execution he asked to arrange a meeting with his daughter, but she refused. In 1989, Ivanov was executed by firing squad.

In the media 

 Documentary film "The Involuntary Murderer" from the series "Legends of the Soviet Investigation".

See also
List of serial killers by country
List of serial killers by number of victims

References

External links 

 "Legends of the Soviet investigation" - "The Involuntary Murderer"

1956 births
1989 deaths
Executed Soviet serial killers
Kazakhstani serial killers
Male serial killers
Murder in Kazakhstan
People executed by the Soviet Union by firing squad
People executed for murder
People from Oskemen
Soviet rapists
Violence against women in Kazakhstan